Cynarctus is an extinct genus of the Borophaginae subfamily of canids native to North America. The genus was first founded by W. D. Matthew in 1901, based from a pair of lower jaws, Cynarctus saxitilis, found in the Pawnee Creek Beds of Colorado. Fossils have been uncovered in Colorado, California, Maryland, western Nebraska, and Texas. It was likely an omnivore, and lacked the bone-cracking adaptations found in some later borophagines. Newer findings have proved the genus to be described as a large dog-like raccoon, a result from combining characteristics from Canidae with Procyonidae.

Species

Cynarctus crucidens 
Found by Mr. A. C. Whitford, from the Department of Geology at The University of Nebraska, and collected for the Nebraska Geological Survey in 1913. This species of Cynarctus is represented by a right lower jaw that was located in beds (Lower Pliocene) in Sioux County, Nebraska. Having an almost complete dentition, it was found to have slight differences in the structure of the mouth/jaw area from the species of C. saxatilis. Findings confirmed that the premolars were more reduced, teeth were narrower, canine smaller, and that the jaw was relatively longer and more slender than species C. saxatilis.

Cynarctus acridens 
Collected by Erwin H. Barbour and Harold J. Cook, for the same Nebraska Geological Survey in 1913, as the species C. crucidens was found. This species is also represented by a part of a lower right jaw and is considered to be the smallest that has so far been discovered. It differs from the species C. saxitilis and C. crucidens, whom have a heavy and broad posterior cinguli, by having a comparatively very weak posterior cingulum.

Cynarctus fortidens 
A part of a right maxilla (Early Pliocene age) was located 75 feet above stream on the west side of Turkey Creek in Donely County, Texas. The fossil was obtained by W. W. Dalquest, during June 1960. The principal cusps of the teeth are rounded, suggesting that it was mainly frugivorous. This species differs from C. crucidens as it lacks an accessory cusp between the protocone and paracone of the fourth upper premolar.

References 

Wang, X., R.H. Tedford, and B.E. Taylor. 1999. Phylogenetic systematics of the Borophaginae (Carnivora, Canidae). Bulletin of the American Museum of Natural History, 243:1-391.

Borophagines
Miocene canids
Miocene mammals of North America
Prehistoric carnivoran genera
Taxa named by William Diller Matthew